The Crown is a four-person sailing dinghy . It was constructed by the Royal New Zealand Navy dockyard in the 1970s. The Crown is widely used as the main training vessel for the New Zealand Sea Cadet Corps.

Performance and design
The Crown can be rigged in two configurations; for rowing (also known as pulling) and for sailing.

The Crowns are made out of fiberglass these are light and very strong.

The boat is suitable to be sailed by 4 sailors, but can be sailed by 2 to 6 sailors.
In the rowing configuration the boat can hold a crew of 8.

Gallery

See also
New Zealand Sea Cadet Corps

References

Sea Cadet Corps, New Zealand
Dinghies